The Waywayseecappo Wolverines are a Junior A ice hockey team playing in the Manitoba Junior Hockey League.  They play their home games in the Waywayseecappo Community Complex in Waywayseecappo, Manitoba, Canada. The team played its first game on September 25, 1999.

Season-by-season record
Note: GP = Games Played, W = Wins, L = Losses, T = Ties, OTL = Overtime Losses, GF = Goals for, GA = Goals against

Playoffs
2000 DNQ
2001 DNQ
2002 DNQ
2003 DNQ
2004 DNQ
2005 DNQ
2006 DNQ
2007 Lost Quarter-final
Dauphin Kings defeated Waywayseecappo Wolverines 4-games-to-3
2008 Lost Quarter-final
Dauphin Kings defeated Waywayseecappo Wolverines 4-games-to-3
2009 Lost Quarter-final
Portage Terriers defeated Waywayseecappo Wolverines 4-games-to-none
2010 DNQ
2011 Lost Quarter-final
Winkler Flyers defeated Waywayseecappo Wolverines 4-games-to-2
2012 DNQ
2013 Lost Quarter-final
Dauphin Kings defeated Waywayseecappo Wolverines 4-games-to-2
2014 Lost Survivor Series
OCN Blizzard defeated Waywayseecappo Wolverines 2-games-to-1
2015 Lost Quarter-final
Waywayseecappo Wolverines defeated Dauphin Kings 2-games-to-0
Portage Terriers defeated Waywayseecappo Wolverines 4-games-to-0
2016 Lost Survivor Series
Swan Valley Stampeders defeated Waywayseecappo Wolverines 2-games-to-0
2017 DNQ
2018 DNQ
2019 Lost Quarter-final
Portage Terriers defeated Waywayseecappo Wolverines 4-games-to-0
2020 Playoffs cancelled
Swan Valley Stampeders leading Waywayseecappo Wolverines 2-games-to-1 when playoffs were cancelled due to COVID-19 pandemic2021 Playoffs cancelled2022 Lost Quarter-finalVirden Oil Capitals defeated Waywayseecappo Wolverines 4-games-to-0''

See also
List of ice hockey teams in Manitoba

References

External links
WayWayseecappo Wolverines website

Manitoba Junior Hockey League teams
1999 establishments in Manitoba
Ice hockey clubs established in 1999